{{Infobox Christian leader
| type             = Cardinal
| honorific-prefix = His Eminence 
| name             = Leopoldo José Brenes Solórzano
| honorific-suffix = 
| title            = Cardinal, Archbishop of Managua
| image            = Leopoldo José Cardinal Brenes Solórzano (cropped).JPG
| image_size       = 
| alt              = 
| caption          = Brenes in 2014
| church           = Roman Catholic Church
| archdiocese      = Managua
| province         = 
| metropolis       = 
| diocese          = 
| see              = Managua
| appointed       = 1 April 2005
| term_end         = 
| predecessor      = Miguel Obando y Bravo
| opposed          = 
| successor        = 
| other_post       = Cardinal-Priest of San Gioacchino ai Prati di CastelloPresident of Episcopal Conference of Nicaragua

| ordination       = 16 August 1974
| ordained_by      = Miguel Obando y Bravo
| consecration     = 19 March 1988
| consecrated_by   = Miguel Obando y Bravo
| cardinal         = 22 February 2014
| created_cardinal_by = Pope Francis
| rank             = Cardinal-Priest 

| birth_name       = 
| birth_date       =  
| birth_place      = Ticuantepe Nicaragua
| death_date       = 
| death_place      = 
| buried           = 
| nationality      = Nicaraguan 
| religion         = Roman Catholic
| residence        = 
| parents          = 
| spouse           = 
| children         = 
| occupation       = 
| profession       = 
| previous_post    = 
| alma_mater       = 
| motto            = "Tu me has enviado"("Tu me misisti")("You have sent me")
| signature        = 
| signature_alt    = 
| coat_of_arms     = Coat of arms of Leopoldo Jose Brenes Solorzano.svg
| coat_of_arms_alt = 

| other            = 
}}

Leopoldo José Brenes Solórzano (born 7 March 1949, in Ticuantepe) is a Nicaraguan prelate of the Catholic Church who has been archbishop of Managua since 2005. He was made a cardinal in 2014. He was an auxiliary bishop of Managua from 1988 to 1991 and bishop of Matagalpa from 1991 to 2005.

Biography
Leopoldo Brenes was born in Ticuantepe on 7 March 1949. He studied first at Rural School of Ticuantepe, Cristóbal Rugada School of Masaya, and Escuela Normal of Managua and then continued his secondary studies at the National Institute of Masaya and at Colegio San José de Calasanz. He then studied philosophy at the National Seminary Nuestra Señora de Fátima of Managua; theology at the Superior Institute of Ecclesiastical Studies (ISEE), México. He earned a bachelor's degree in theology at the Pontifical Gregorian University in Rome and a licentiate in dogmatic theology at the Pontifical Lateran University in Rome. He was ordained a deacon on 13 January 1974.

Priesthood
He was ordained a priest in Managua on 16 August 1974 by Miguel Obando Bravo. He then served in a number of roles, including priest in the parishes of Tisma, Las Brisas, la Asunción, and St. Pius X in Managua, and vicar for pastoral care and substitute vicar general of the Archdiocese of Managua. He was later a parish priest of Sagrada Familia, María Inmaculada, San Pío X, Espíritu Santo and Santa Rosa and San Agustín in Managua, and vicar for pastoral care of the Archdiocese of Managua and episcopal vicar for vocations and ministries.

Bishop and archbishop
Pope John Paul II named him titular bishop of Maturba and appointed him auxiliary bishop of Managua on 13 February 1988. He was consecrated a bishop on 19 March 1988 in the cathedral of Managua by Cardinal Miguel Obando Bravo, Archbishop of Managua, assisted by Paolo Giglio, apostolic nuncio to Nicaragua, and Arturo Rivera Damas, Archbishop of San Salvador. His episcopal motto is Tu me has enviado''. He was made Bishop of Matagalpa on 2 November 1991 and made Archbishop of Managua on 1 April 2005. He took possession of the see on 21 May. He received the pallium from Pope Benedict XVI on 29 June 2005. 

In the Episcopal Conference of Nicaragua he has been president of the Commission for Vocations and Ministries; secretary general of the Episcopal Conference; president of Cáritas Nacional; president of the Commission for Catechesis; and president of the Commission for Social Communications. He has served as a delegate for the Eucharistic Congresses, delegate to the Special Assembly for America of the Synod of Bishops, delegate to the Latin American Episcopal Council (CELAM), President of the CELAM Commission Family-Life-Youth, President of the Episcopal Secretariat of Central America (SEDAC). He has been Vice-president of the Episcopal Conference of Nicaragua and its president.

Pope Benedict named him to a five-year term as a member of the Pontifical Commission for Latin America on 8 October 2009.

Cardinal
On 22 February 2014, Pope Francis made him a cardinal, assigning him the titular church of San Gioacchino ai Prati di Castello.  On 15 January 2014 Pope Francis confirmed his membership in the Pontifical Commission for Latin America and on 22 May 2014 made him a member of the Pontifical Council for Justice and Peace.

See also
Cardinals created by Francis

References

External links
 
Leopoldo Brenes Solorzano

 

|-
 

|-
 

1949 births
Living people
21st-century Roman Catholic archbishops in Nicaragua
Pontifical Lateran University alumni
Cardinals created by Pope Francis
Nicaraguan cardinals
Pontifical Gregorian University alumni
Members of the Pontifical Council for Justice and Peace
Members of the Pontifical Commission for Latin America
People from Managua Department
Roman Catholic bishops of Matagalpa
Roman Catholic archbishops of Managua
Roman Catholic bishops of Managua